Acidoxanthopsis is a genus of tephritid  or fruit flies in the family Tephritidae.

There is only one species placed under the genus Acidoxanthopsis, Acidoxanthopsis advena (Hering, 1941).

References

Trypetinae
Tephritidae genera